Ambia is a genus of moths of the family Crambidae.

Species
Ambia albiflavalis Hampson, 1917
Ambia albomaculalis Hampson, 1897
Ambia ambrealis Viette, 1960
Ambia andasalis Viette, 1960
Ambia anosibalis Viette, 1958
Ambia argentifascialis Marion, 1957
Ambia catalaianus (Viette, 1954)
Ambia chalcichroalis Hampson, 1906
Ambia chrysogramma Hampson, 1917
Ambia colonalis (Bremer, 1864)
Ambia cymophoralis Hampson, 1917
Ambia ellipes (Tams, 1935)
Ambia fulvicolor Hampson, 1917
Ambia fusalis Hampson, 1906
Ambia gueneealis Viette, 1957
Ambia iambealis (Walker, 1859)
Ambia locuples (Butler, 1889)
Ambia magnificalis Swinhoe, 1895
Ambia mantasoalis Viette, 1978
Ambia marmorealis Marion & Viette, 1956
Ambia melanalis Hampson, 1906
Ambia melanistis Hampson, 1917
Ambia mesoscotalis Hampson, 1906
Ambia naumanni Speidel & Stüning, 2005
Ambia nosivalis Viette, 1958
Ambia novaguinensis Kenrick, 1912
Ambia obliquistriga Rothschild, 1915
Ambia oligalis Hampson, 1906
Ambia pedionoma West, 1931
Ambia phobos Viette, 1989
Ambia pictoralis Viette, 1960
Ambia prolalis Viette, 1958
Ambia ptolycusalis Walker, 1859
Ambia punctimarginata Rothschild, 1915
Ambia schistochaeta Tams, 1935
Ambia tendicularis Rebel, 1915
Ambia tenebrosalis Hampson, 1896
Ambia thyridialis Lederer, 1855
Ambia vagilinealis Hampson, 1906
Ambia vilisalis Viette, 1958
Ambia xantholeuca Hampson, 1896
Ambia yamanakai Kirpichnikova, 1999

References

Musotiminae
Crambidae genera
Taxa named by Francis Walker (entomologist)